Chaudhary Lal Singh (born 2 February 1959) is an Indian politician and a member of the 12th Legislative Assembly of Jammu and Kashmir. He was Minister for Forest, Environment, Ecology of J&K in PDP-BJP coalition government in J&K. He represents the Basohli constituency in Jammu and Kashmir Assembly and is president of the Dogra Swabhimaan Sangathan.

Political career
Singh started his political career as a student leader. He was elected as MLA from Basholi constituency in 1996 J&K Assembly elections. He was re-elected as MLA from Basohli constituency in the 2002 J&K Assembly Elections. He was inducted into the state cabinet as Minister for Health and Medical Education in Congress-PDP coalition government. After that he was elected as MP in 14th Lok Sabha in 2004 from Udhampur constituency. He was again elected as MP from there in the 15th Lok Sabha in 2009.

Change in Political Affiliation
In August 2014, Singh parted ways with Congress after being denied ticket as Congress candidate during 16th Lok Sabha elections. He formally joined Bhartiya Janata Party in presence of BJP President Amit Shah at a function in Kathua. He was sacked by the BJP as he distorted evidence in the rape trial.

CBI Probe against Chaudhary Lal Singh 
CBI initiates probe into education trust run by former J&K Minister Chaudhary Lal Singh

High Court pulls up ex-minister 
The Jammu & Kashmir High Court pulled up the ex-disgraced minister on matters pertaining to accommodation.

Controversy
In March 2015, a female doctor in J&K sought the registration of a criminal case against Singh for allegedly misbehaving with her in public. Dr. Gurmeet Kour, the state-run hospital registrar for Psychiatry Diseases, said Minister for Health and Medical Education Choudhary Lal Singh shouted at her in public, leaving her "mentally harassed and wrecked". Singh claimed that was an attempt to prevent him from bringing an improvement in the health facilities in J&K. In July 2015, Singh was criticized for touching the collar of a female doctor to fold that correctly in a government hospital in Kashmir.

In 2018 he attended a rally in support of the accused rapists in the Kathua Rape and Murder case. Singh defended his attendance at the rally, stating that he was there to "defuse the situation". Nonetheless, Singh resigned as a result of the controversy.

References

1959 births
Living people
Jammu and Kashmir MLAs 2014–2018
Bharatiya Janata Party politicians from Jammu and Kashmir
Indian National Congress politicians from Jammu and Kashmir
People from Kathua district
Kashmiri people
India MPs 2004–2009
Lok Sabha members from Jammu and Kashmir
India MPs 2009–2014
Jammu and Kashmir MLAs 1996–2002
Jammu and Kashmir MLAs 2002–2008